Johan Vilhelm Snellman (12 May 1806 – 4 July 1881) was an influential Fennoman philosopher and Finnish statesman, ennobled in 1866. He was one of the most important 'awakeners' or promoters of Finnish nationalism, alongside Elias Lönnrot and J. L. Runeberg.

Life and career
Snellman was born in Stockholm, Sweden, the son of Kristian Henrik Snellman, a ship's captain. After the Russian conquest of  Finland in 1808–09, and the promising establishment of the semi-autonomous Grand Duchy of Finland, his family moved there in 1813, to the Ostrobothnian coastal town of Kokkola. His mother Maria Magdalena Snellman died there only a year later.

In 1835, after academic work amongst followers of Hegel, Snellman was appointed lecturer at the University of Helsinki, where he belonged to the famous circle of Cygnaeus, Lönnrot,  and Runeberg comprising the brightest of their generation. Snellman's lectures quickly became popular with the students, but in November 1838 his lectureship was temporarily recalled after a judicial proceeding that ultimately aimed to establish firm governmental control of new and oppositional thought among the academics.

As a consequence, Snellman exiled himself to Sweden and Germany, more or less voluntarily, from 1839 to 1842. By the time he returned to Helsinki, his popularity had increased further, but the political juncture did not allow the university to employ him. Instead, he took up the position as headmaster for a school in distant Kuopio and published starkly polemical periodicals, including the paper Saima in Swedish, which advocated the duty of the educated classes to take up the language of the then circa 85% majority of Finns, and develop Finnish into a language of the civilized world, useful for academic works, fine arts, state craft, and nation building.

Saima was suppressed by the government in 1846. In 1848–49, Snellman was again rebuffed when applying for the position of professor at Finland's University in Helsinki. After having contemplated a renewed exile in Sweden, this time possibly definitive, Snellman in 1850 gave up the position in Kuopio and moved to Helsinki, where he and his family lived under economically awkward conditions until the death of Emperor Nicholas in 1855. Then it again became possible for Snellman to publish periodical papers on political issues.

He had married Johanna Lovisa Wennberg in 1845, and they had five children before her death in 1857.

In 1856, Snellman was finally appointed professor, which was met with great satisfaction among politically interested Finns. However, Snellman's unparalleled popularity could not remain. He was a generation older than the most active political opposition, and now backed a government which had the brightest expectations for Finland under the rule of Emperor Alexander II. The language strife in Finland, of which he was the chief initiator, contributed also to substantial opposition against him and his views. Finally and not least, his stance against the Polish rebels of the January Uprising of 1863 was seen by many as the ultimate sign of unprincipled ingratiation.

In 1863 Snellman was called to a cabinet post in the Senate of Finland, in effect as Chancellor of the Exchequer, where he became an energetic and valued senator. He accomplished a language decree from the Emperor that would gradually give Finns a position equal to that of the Swedish within the Finnish government. In practical terms it meant the re-establishment of the Parliament, which had remained inhibited since the Russian conquest. 

A separate Finnish currency, the Markka, was introduced in 1860, and Snellman managed to tie it to silver instead of to the ruble. The Markka came to be of the utmost value for Finland. Snellman's tenure as Finance Minister would be tainted by the Finnish famine of 1866–1868, aggravated by the government's strict fiscal policy, but Snellman worked to get aid while trying to protect the new currency.

Snellman's inflexibility and high profile position in the political debate would however, together with his old reputation as radical agitator of the 1830s–1840s, accumulate too much resistance and aversion to his person and his policies. In 1868 he was forced to resign from the senate.

For the remainder of his life, he continued to participate in the political debate, and now ennobled he belonged to the Nobles' Chamber of the parliament. Snellman never lost his popularity among his Fennoman followers, but he had become a highly divisive symbol in Finland's political landscape.

Honors 

Johan Vilhelm Snellman first appeared on a 1960 coin, commemorating the introduction of the markka denomination in 1860. He was recently selected as the main motif for another commemorative coin, the €10 Johan Vilhelm Snellman commemorative coin, minted in 2006 celebrating the 200th anniversary of his birth. The obverse depicts J.V. Snellman. It also depicts the logo of the Europe Coins Programme. The reverse design features represent the dawn of Finnish culture.

A park in Kuopio called the Snellman Park (Snellmaninpuisto) has been named after J. V. Snellman; it was formerly known as the former location of the Kuopio Market Square. In the middle of the park, a bust of J. V. Snellman sculpted by Johannes Takanen was unveiled on July 3, 1886.

Snellman's birthday on May 12 is dedicated to him and it has become one of Finland's flag days, known as the "Day of Finnish Identity" or the "Finnish Heritage Day".

Works 
In 1842 Snellman published his foremost work Läran om staten (Study of the State).

References 

 http://finland.fi/Public/default.aspx?contentid=160109&nodeid=37598&culture=en-US
 http://www.kansallisbiografia.fi/english/person/3639
 http://global.britannica.com/EBchecked/topic/550446/Johan-Vilhelm-Snellman
 http://runeberg.org/authors/snellman.html
 http://www.taidemuseo.fi/english/veisto/veistossivu.html?id=95

External links

 J. V. Snellman in 375 humanists – 12 May 2015. Faculty of Arts, University of Helsinki.
 J.V. Snellman: Where would Finland be without him? at thisisFINLAND.

1806 births
1881 deaths
Politicians from Stockholm
Swedish-speaking Finns
Finnish Party politicians
Finnish senators
Members of the Diet of Finland
Finnish philosophers
19th-century Finnish nobility
Academic staff of the University of Helsinki
19th-century Finnish philosophers
19th-century Finnish politicians